is a Japanese racewalker. He competed in the 20 km walk at the 2012 Summer Olympics, where he placed 25th.

References

1993 births
Living people
Japanese male racewalkers
Olympic athletes of Japan
Athletes (track and field) at the 2012 Summer Olympics
20th-century Japanese people
21st-century Japanese people